Felanitx or Felanich is a municipality in the Spanish autonomous community of the Balearic Islands, located in the southeast of Majorca,  48 kilometres (30 miles) from the capital Palma de Mallorca.

The town, dating back to the 13th century, lies near the medieval Sant Salvador Monastery with its Gothic architecture.

Culture 
The St. Agustí convent was founded by Augustinians in the 17th century. In 1881 the Felanitx town council took over the church and celebrates that event every year. It's celebrated by performing Els Cavallets, a dance in which six Cavallets between 10 and 14 years of age, perform dances. The Cavallets wear a cardboard horse around their middles, dressed in a red shirt and a green hat. They dance around La Dama, a girl in a green dress with a red hat. There are nine different dances: es rollet, ses tres potadetes, s'envestida, es canvis, ses cadenilles, es passeig, es pas nou, esses velles and esses noves.

The dances are accompanied by music played on the Xeremia, the Flabiol and the tambourine.

They perform on the days of Santa Margalida and Sant Agustí.

Economy
Felanitx is also known for its wine and particularly its brandy, with over 60 distilleries in the local area recorded in 1749 . It is a center of production of earthenware watercoolers and other pottery since at least the 3rd century BC.

A weekly market takes place in Felanitx every Sunday morning.

People 
Felanitx is the birthplace of Miquel Barceló, a contemporary painter.

Other famous people from Felanitx include:
 Guillem Sagrera (1380–1456), Gothic architect and sculptor
 Miquel Bauçà (1940–2004), writer
 Guillermo Timoner (born 1926), world champion cyclist 
Mariona Caldentey (born 1996) soccer player

Gallery

References

External links
 

 
Populated places in Mallorca